The 2021–22 NBL season was the 23rd season for the Cairns Taipans in the NBL, and their first under the leadership of their new head coach Adam Forde.

Squad

Signings 

 Imports Scott Machado and Cameron Oliver, and Next Star Mojave King had already signed two-season contracts the season prior.
 After their penultimate game of the 2020–21 season, the Taipans announced that Head Coach Mike Kelly would not be returning for the 2021–22 season.
 On 25 June, the team option on Jordan Ngatai's contract was taken up by the club. His original contract was a two year contract (with the second year being a team option), having only joined the Taipans at the start of the 2020–21 season.
 On 26 June, Kouat Noi signed a new two-season contract with the club (the second year being a mutual option). This extends his time in Cairns up to potentially four seasons, having joined the team before the 2019–20 season. Nathan Jawai and the club also took up their mutual option on the second year of his contract, extending his time in Cairns to seven seasons.
 On 27 June, the final day before free agency began, the Taipans took up the mutual option on the contract of Majok Deng. They also abandoned the option on the contract of Mirko Đerić, instead signing him to a three-year deal (the final year being a mutual option).
 On 29 June, Adam Forde was announced as the club's new Head Coach, signing on a two-year deal. Forde joined the club as an experienced coach in the NBL, having spent eight years as an assistant coach with the Perth Wildcats, followed by a two-year stint with the Sydney Kings, both as an assistant coach and as a Head Coach.
 On 13 July, Deng re-signed for three seasons, overriding the mutual option that himself and the club had taken up weeks earlier. The new extension will see Deng remain in Cairns until 2024.
 On 14 July, King was transferred to the Adelaide 36ers.
 On 19 July, Keanu Pinder was signed as the club's first new player for the season. He signed on a two-year deal (second-year mutual option).
 On 24 July, Jarrod Kenny re-signed with the Taipans for the 2021–22 season. This will be Kenny’s fourth season with the Taipans after he joined the club for the 2018–19 season.
 On 5 August, Sam Gruggen was signed as an Assistant Coach on a two-year deal. Gruggen joined the club after serving as an Assistant Coach for Forde during the 2020–21 season, as well as serving time with the Townsville Crocodiles.
 On 6 August, Tahjere McCall signed with the Taipans on a one-year deal. McCall joined the Taipans after serving as an injury replacement player with Orléans Loiret Basket and winning the NBA G League championship with the Lakeland Magic. During his time with the Magic, McCall was voted into the G League's All-Defensive Team.
 13 August, Bul Kuol was signed on a two-year deal and filled the final place on the roster. Kuol played College basketball with the California Baptist Lancers and Detroit Mercy Titans before returning to Australia, where he averaged 18.2 points and 4.8 rebounds with the Knox Raiders of the NBL1 South.
 On 18 August, Kerry Williams was signed as the second Assistant Coach. Williams spent the season prior as the Head Coach of the Cairns Marlins of the NBL1 North, and before that also spent multiple seasons with the Cairns Dolphins of the Queensland Basketball League. Williams also spent five seasons with the Taipans as a player before transitioning into a front office role with the club.
 On 16 September, the Taipans announced that import Cameron Oliver had been released from the final year of his contract after signing an Exhibit 10 contract with a California based National Basketball Association team, later revealed to be the Los Angeles Lakers.
 On 17 September, Stephen Zimmerman was signed as Oliver's replacement on a one-year deal. Zimmerman signed with the club after winning the Czech National Basketball League with Basketball Nymburk, where he averaged 8.9 points and 7.9 rebounds across 17 minutes per game.
 On 7 October, Brayden Inger was signed by the Taipans as a development player. He joined the club after competing in the NZNBL with the Southland Sharks.
 On 30 December, Marshall Nelson was signed as an Injury Replacement Player for Machado.

Roster

Depth chart

Pre-season

Ladder

Game log 

|-style="background:#fcc;"
| 1
| 14 November
| Adelaide
| L 87–91 (OT)
| Deng, Zimmerman (18)
| Stephen Zimmerman (11)
| Scott Machado (5)
| MyState Bank Arenanot available
| 0–1
|-style="background:#fcc;"
| 2
| 16 November
| Tasmania
| L 66–81
| Stephen Zimmerman (16)
| Stephen Zimmerman (11)
| Scott Machado (9)
| MyState Bank Arenanot available
| 0–2
|-style="background:#fcc;"
| 3
| 21 November
| @ Perth
| L 96–87
| Nate Jawai (21)
| Tahjere McCall (13)
| Tahjere McCall (6)
| Ulverstone Sports & Leisure Centrenot available
| 0–3
|-style="background:#fcc;"
| 4
| 24 November
| Brisbane
| L 86–94
| Tahjere McCall (17)
| Keanu Pinder (10)
| Noi, Machado (5)
| Ulverstone Sports & Leisure Centrenot available
| 0–4
|-style="background:#fcc;"
| 5
| 26 November
| @ Tasmania
| L 83–68
| Kouat Noi (12)
| Stephen Zimmerman (8)
| Tahjere McCall (5)
| Elphin Sports Centrenot available
| 0–5

Regular season

Ladder

Game log 

|-style="background:#fcc;"
| 1
| 5 December
| @ Perth
| L 90–67
| Kouat Noi (17)
| Stephen Zimmerman (14)
| Scott Machado (6)
| RAC Arena, Perth10,800
| 0–1
|-style="background:#cfc;"
| 2
| 11 December
| Tasmania
| W 69–62
| Tahjere McCall (20)
| Stephen Zimmerman (12)
| Tahjere McCall (5)
| Cairns Convention Centre4,015
| 1–1
|-style="background:#cfc;"
| 3
| 18 December
| Adelaide
| W 93–67
| Majok Deng (23)
| Stephen Zimmerman (9)
| Tahjere McCall (10)
| Cairns Convention Centre3,314
| 2–1
|-style="background:#fcc;"
| 4
| 31 December
| Perth
| L 78–84
| Majok Deng (27)
| Stephen Zimmerman (9)
| Kenny, Kuol, Noi (4)
| Cairns Convention Centre4,339
| 2–2

|-style="background:#fcc;"
| 5
| 25 January
| @ S.E. Melbourne
| L 87–77
| Tahjere McCall (16)
| Stephen Zimmerman (8)
| Tahjere McCall (9)
| Gippsland Regional Indoor Sports Stadium2,634
| 2–3
|-style="background:#fcc;"
| 6
| 29 January
| Illawarra
| L 75–94
| Tahjere McCall (19)
| Keanu Pinder (12)
| Tahjere McCall (6)
| Cairns Convention Centre3,095
| 2–4

|-style="background:#cfc;"
| 7
| 5 February
| @ Brisbane
| W 94–102
| Deng, Kuol (26)
| Stephen Zimmerman (14)
| Tahjere McCall (6)
| Nissan Arena2,695
| 3–4
|-style="background:#fcc;"
| 8
| 12 February
| @ Illawarra
| L 87–81
| Tahjere McCall (17)
| Keanu Pinder (9)
| Tahjere McCall (4)
| WIN Entertainment Centre2,652
| 3–5
|-style="background:#fcc;"
| 9
| 14 February
| New Zealand
| L 83–84
| Majok Deng (21)
| Stephen Zimmerman (11)
| Tahjere McCall (6)
| Cairns Convention Centre2,795
| 3–6
|-style="background:#fcc;"
| 10
| 18 February
| @ Illawarra
| L 79–54
| Majok Deng (11)
| Stephen Zimmerman (8)
| Tahjere McCall (3)
| WIN Entertainment Centre2,275
| 3–7
|-style="background:#fcc;"
| 11
| 20 February
| @ Adelaide
| L 82–71
| Stephen Zimmerman (21)
| Stephen Zimmerman (13)
| Tahjere McCall (5)
| Adelaide Entertainment Centre5,068
| 3–8
|-style="background:#cfc;"
| 12
| 24 February
| Brisbane
| W 73–69
| Scott Machado (17)
| Stephen Zimmerman (12)
| Scott Machado (7)
| Cairns Convention Centre2,853
| 4–8
|-style="background:#fcc;"
| 13
| 27 February
| Melbourne
| L 73–89
| Tahjere McCall (16)
| Keanu Pinder (9)
| Tahjere McCall (7)
| Cairns Convention Centre3,272
| 4–9

|-style="background:#fcc;"
| 14
| 6 March
| @ Sydney
| L 98–88 
| Scott Machado (26)
| Stephen Zimmerman (14)
| Scott Machado (8)
| Qudos Bank Arena9,112
| 4–10
|-style="background:#fcc;"
| 15
| 11 March
| Tasmania
| L 69–85
| Stephen Zimmerman (19)
| Stephen Zimmerman (8)
| Kenny, Machado (5)
| Cairns Convention Centre3,300
| 4–11
|-style="background:#fcc;"
| 16
| 13 March
| Sydney
| L 77–86
| Tahjere McCall (21)
| Majok Deng (8)
| Tahjere McCall (7)
| Cairns Convention Centre3,629
| 4–12
|-style="background:#fcc;"
| 17
| 18 March
| @ Adelaide
| L 83–57
| Keanu Pinder (15)
| Keanu Pinder (14)
| Scott Machado (6)
| Adelaide Entertainment Centre3,596
| 4–13
|-style="background:#cfc;"
| 18
| 20 March
| @ Brisbane
| W 88–98
| Tahjere McCall (21)
| Keanu Pinder (9)
| Scott Machado (11)
| Nissan Arena2,409
| 5–13
|-style="background:#fcc;"
| 19
| 25 March
| S.E. Melbourne
| L 74–86
| Tahjere McCall (14)
| McCall, Pinder (9)
| McCall, Machado (5)
| Cairns Convention Centre3,044
| 5–14
|-style="background:#cfc;"
| 20
| 27 March
| @ New Zealand
| W 90–93
| Kouat Noi (19)
| Deng, Noi (6)
| Scott Machado (6)
| Cairns Convention Centreclosed event
| 6–14

|-style="background:#cfc;"
| 21
| 2 April
| S.E. Melbourne
| W 90–85
| Keanu Pinder (21)
| Keanu Pinder (13)
| Scott Machado (11)
| Cairns Convention Centre3,206
| 7–14
|-style="background:#cfc;"
| 22
| 4 April
| @ New Zealand
| W 77–87
| Keanu Pinder (21)
| Kouat Noi (14)
| Scott Machado (6)
| MyState Bank Arenaclosed event
| 8–14
|-style="background:#fcc;"
| 23
| 8 April
| @ Tasmania
| L 87–80
| Nathan Jawai (17)
| Keanu Pinder (9)
| Scott Machado (6)
| MyState Bank Arena4,738
| 8–15
|-style="background:#fcc;"
| 24
| 10 April
| Melbourne
| L 63–92
| Keanu Pinder (15)
| Keanu Pinder (12)
| Ben Ayre (5)
| Cairns Convention Centre3,418
| 8–16
|-style="background:#fcc;"
| 25
| 16 April
| @ Perth
| L 106–87
| Keanu Pinder (24)
| Keanu Pinder (8)
| Tahjere McCall (11)
| RAC Arena10,314
| 8–17
|-style="background:#fcc;"
| 26
| 18 April
| @ Melbourne
| L 92–80
| Ben Ayre (20)
| Keanu Pinder (9)
| Ben Ayre (10)
| John Cain Arena6,042
| 8–18
|-style="background:#fcc;"
| 27
| 21 April
| Sydney
| L 77–87
| Tahjere McCall (22)
| Keanu Pinder (14)
| Tahjere McCall (4)
| Cairns Convention Centre3,150
| 8–19
|-style="background:#cfc;"
| 28
| 23 April
| Brisbane
| W 112–98
| Tahjere McCall (42)
| Keanu Pinder (7)
| Tahjere McCall (10)
| Cairns Convention Centre3,552
| 9–19

Awards

Club awards 
 Club MVP: Tahjere McCall

See also
2021–22 NBL season
Cairns Taipans

References

External links
 Official Website
 Team Statistics

Cairns Taipans season
Cairns Taipans season
Cairns Taipans seasons
Cairns Taipans